Earl of Avon was a title in the Peerage of the United Kingdom. It was created in 1961 for the former Prime Minister Sir Anthony Eden, together with the subsidiary title Viscount Eden, of Royal Leamington Spa in the County of Warwick, also in the Peerage of the United Kingdom. The titles became extinct on the death of his only surviving son Nicholas, the second Earl, in 1985.

Eden was a member of the prominent Eden family. He was the third son of Sir William Eden, 7th Baronet, of West Auckland, and 5th Baronet, of Maryland.  Eden's nephew was fellow Conservative politician John Benedict Eden, Baron Eden of Winton.  Eden's great-great-grandfather Sir Robert Eden, 1st Baronet, of Maryland, was the elder brother of William Eden, 1st Baron Auckland, and Morton Eden, 1st Baron Henley.

Earls of Avon (1961)
Anthony Eden, 1st Earl of Avon (1897–1977)
Nicholas Eden, 2nd Earl of Avon (1930–1985)

See also
Baron Auckland
Baron Henley
Eden baronets

References

 
1961 establishments in the United Kingdom
1985 disestablishments in the United Kingdom
Extinct earldoms in the Peerage of the United Kingdom
Eden family
Peerages created for the Prime Minister of the United Kingdom
Noble titles created in 1961
Noble titles created for UK MPs